Santa Maria de Merlès (Officially and in Catalan) is a  municipality in Catalonia. It is officially within the comarca of Berguedà, but traditionally, it is a part of the natural comarca of Lluçanès. The municipality is located on the riera, or stream, of Merlès, from which the town takes its name. It is located about 14 kilometers east of Puig-reig, and 8 kilometers west of Prats de Lluçanès, the nearest market town.

The town is divided into two parishes, Santa Maria (in the Bishopric of Solsona) to the west of the riera, and Sant Martí (in the Bishopric of Vic) to the east.

Although the municipality lies within the natural region of Lluçanès, it voted in 2015 not to join a proposed new comarca of that name, but the plan was put on hold due to insufficient support.

Folklore
The town was traditionally dominated by two important families, the Cortadas and the Vilaltas. Their monumental houses still stand in the municipality. A popular legend offers an explanation for the reconstruction of the Church of Sta. Maria in the 17th century.

An animosity developed between the two families, and in order to anger the patriarch of the Cortada household, the head of the Vilalta family sat one Sunday in the pew reserved for his rival. The patriarch of the Cortadas was so offended that he left church, only to return with a firearm. He killed the head of the Vilaltas in the church and, as a result, the building had to be torn down and rebuilt on the other side of the main road. Later, the patriarch of the Cortadas felt remorse for what he had done, and as penitence erected a chapel dedicated to Saint Mary Magdalene on his property, beside the main road.

Town festivals
Festa Major, 15 August
Festival of Sant Pau de Pinós, Sunday nearest to 8 September
Festival of Sant Martí, 11 November

Sites of interest
Romanesque bridge of Sant Martí
Church of Sant Pau de Pinós, begun in the 12th century
Church of Sant Miquel de Terradelles, from the 12th century
Baroque church of Santa Maria de Merlès, from the 17th century
Ruins of the Castle of Merlès, from the 12th century
Chapel of Santa Maria Magdalena, with zoomorphic carvings
Camadoca, a wildlife center dedicated to the native species of the Riera de Merlès. Open to visitors.

References

External links
 Town Website 
 Government data pages 

Municipalities in Berguedà